The Town of Morrison is a home rule municipality in Jefferson County, Colorado, United States. The population was 428 at the 2010 census. Red Rocks Amphitheatre is located nearby.

History

This small foothills settlement is named after George Morrison (April 16, 1822 – June 11, 1895), a builder and businessman who left a mark not only on the town that now bears his name, but on the history of the area. A stonemason who immigrated from Canada to the Mt. Vernon area in 1859, he helped found the town of Mt. Vernon and built the Mt. Vernon House, seat of the territorial government under Robert Steele, and an important stop for travelers on the Mt. Vernon Toll Road from Denver to the goldfields of the Rocky Mountains. He became a U.S. citizen on May 22, 1862. George Morrison later moved south to Bear Creek, where he founded the Morrison Stone, Lime, and Town Co., and in 1874 platted the town that became known as Morrison, or briefly as Mt. Morrison. With Gov. John Evans, he was instrumental in bringing the Denver, South Park, and Pacific Railroad to Morrison in 1874.

As a quarryman, Morrison developed the building stone and other industrial stone (lime, gypsum) of the Morrison/Mt. Vernon area, bringing fame to the region for its high-quality dimension stone. Two of the three stone buildings he built in Morrison, as well as the Mt. Vernon House further north, are still standing; all three surviving buildings are recognized historic sites (National Register of Historic Places, 1976). Before its demolition in 1982, the original Evergreen Hotel, built by George Morrison in 1874, served as the first home of Sacred Heart College (now Regis University), and later as the Mt. Morrison Casino, where John Brisben Walker entertained many of the dignitaries he brought to the foothills as part of his promotional enterprises. The Morrison Schoolhouse he built served the town's educational needs from its construction in 1875 until 1955, and stands today as a private residence. The Cliff House, built as the Morrison family home in 1873, now provides guest lodging.

These landmarks represent a distinctive style of construction and are enduring monuments to George Morrison's contributions to Jefferson County's history. Stone for these structures was quarried in his "red sandstone quarry" at the end of the Dakota Hogback near Morrison. Building stone was also shipped to Denver, where it now comprises parts of the Brown Palace Hotel, Union Station, and "many of Denver's early day mansions".

Mount Morrison behind Red Rocks Park is also named after George Morrison. In the late 1800s, an important regional geologic layer of Late Jurassic age, the Morrison Formation, was named after the town of Morrison, and is today famous as the first discovery site of three 150-million-year-old dinosaurs, Apatosaurus, Diplodocus, and the Colorado state fossil, Stegosaurus. The Morrison Formation covers parts of thirteen western states and has yielded much of our understanding of the extinct animals that lived in the West so long ago.

Dinosaur discoveries
In 1877, the holotypic remains of the dinosaurs Stegosaurus armatus and Apatosaurus ajax were discovered near Morrison by Arthur Lakes. The majority of these fossils were shipped to Othniel Charles Marsh at Yale's Peabody Museum of Natural History in New Haven, Connecticut. These finds from the Morrison area figured in the 19th century "Bone Wars" between rival paleontologists Marsh and Edward Drinker Cope.

In 1896, the Late Jurassic section of sedimentary rock excavated by Lakes was formally named the Morrison Formation for the town near the prominent outcrops where it was described (Eldridge, 1896).

The Morrison Natural History Museum houses and displays some fossils found by Lakes, and museum staff have begun reworking Lakes' original digs at Quarry 10. In 2006, the MNHM reported rare adult Stegosaurus tracks from the Morrison area. A year later the first hatchling Stegosaurus tracks were reported. These fossils are on display at the museum.

Cretaceous-age dinosaur tracks and one of Lakes' historic dig sites can still be viewed on what is now known as Dinosaur Ridge east of Morrison.

Also located near Morrison is a significant archaeological site; known as the LoDaisKa site, it was inhabited for approximately 7,500 years.

20th century
The Town of Morrison was officially incorporated following a unanimous election on January 9, 1906. Sixty-nine votes were cast. On February 13, 1906, a second election gave the newly created town a board of trustees. The first mayor was Thomas Cowan Morrison, son of the town's founder. The original trustees were Dr. Frank L. Luce, Charles Pike, Jacob Schneider, J.W. McLean, Peter O. Nelson, and Lawrence E. "Lee" LaGrow. Most of those names are well recognized as pioneers in Morrison's history. The new board held its first meeting on February 14, 1906.

Morrison's first ordinances were passed in February and March 1906, as the original board began the process of managing the town's affairs. The first set a fiscal year beginning March 1, directed the clerk to certify valuation and the board to levy taxes based thereon, and directed the town treasurer to collect funds from the county treasurer.

Pete Morrison, grandson of the town's founder and son of the first mayor, achieved fame during the early 1900s as a cowboy star in silent film, and ultimately had his own studio, Lariat Productions, in Hollywood.

In 1976, the Morrison Historic District was listed on the National Register of Historic Places.

Geography
Morrison is located at  (39.651764, -105.190344). Morrison is southwest of Denver and is located on State Highway 470 and Morrison Road.

The Morrison postal ZIP code (80465) extends west up Turkey Creek Canyon and south of the town. It thus applies to an area covering approximately 5,000 addresses. Because the Morrison Post Office serves this large area beyond the town boundaries proper, many events and people connected with "Morrison" are actually in unincorporated portions of Jefferson County.

Demographics

As of the census of 2000, there were 430 people, 136 households, and 73 families residing within the incorporated town. The racial makeup of the town was 98.84% White, 0.23% African American, 0.23% Native American, 0.23% Asian, 0.23% from other races, and 0.23% from two or more races. Hispanic or Latino of any race were 1.86% of the population.

There were 125 households, out of which 23.2% had children under the age of 18 living with them, 52.0% were married couples living together, 4.8% had a female householder with no husband present, and 41.6% were non-families. 33.6% of all households were made up of individuals, and 13.6% had someone living alone who was 65 years of age or older. The average household size was 2.18 and the average family size was 2.82.

In the town, the population was spread out, with 11.9% under the age of 18, 4.7% from 18 to 24, 20.2% from 25 to 44, 19.5% from 45 to 64, and 43.7% who were 65 years of age or older. The median age was 58 years. For every 100 females, there were 64.8 males. For every 100 females age 18 and over, there were 62.0 males. Population statistics are influenced by the large number of town residents who domicile in the Bear Creek Nursing Home.

The median income for a household in the town was $53,438, and the median income for a family was $68,333. Males had a median income of $37,292 versus $30,893 for females. The per capita income for the town was $24,347. About 4.9% of families and 5.5% of the population were below the poverty line, including 7.8% of those under age 18 and none of those age 65 or over.

Government

The local government features a mayor, town manager and a board of trustees. 

The town is infamous as a speed trap. Press reports indicate that about half the town's $2.6 million budget comes from traffic fines. More than 90% of police activity is issuing speeding tickets.

Notable people
Adolph Coors III, CEO of Coors Brewing Company
Margaret Feinberg, Christian writer
Pete Morrison, silent film actor
Ricky Rahne, Penn State football offensive coordinator
Patrick Park, folk singer
Trey Parker, co-creator of South Park
Jim Suttle, former mayor of Omaha, Nebraska
Robert Hall Tinker, former mayor of Rockford, Illinois

See also

Outline of Colorado
Index of Colorado-related articles
State of Colorado
Colorado cities and towns
Colorado municipalities
Colorado counties
Jefferson County, Colorado
Jefferson County R-1 School District
List of statistical areas in Colorado
Front Range Urban Corridor
North Central Colorado Urban Area
Denver-Aurora-Boulder, CO Combined Statistical Area
Denver-Aurora-Broomfield, CO Metropolitan Statistical Area
Arthur Lakes discovers first Stegosaurus and Apatosaurus fossils near Morrison in 1877
Morrison Fossil Area National Natural Landmark
Morrison Formation
Morrison Natural History Museum
Red Rocks Country Club
Red Rocks Park and Amphitheatre

References

External links
 
Town of Morrison official website
CDOT map of Morrison
Historic Morrison
Morrison Discovery Map

Towns in Jefferson County, Colorado
Towns in Colorado
Denver metropolitan area